Michael Joseph Ryan (14 October 1930 – September 2006) was an English professional footballer who played as a winger in the Football League for Lincoln City and York City, in non-League football for Chase of Chertsey and Yeovil Town, and was on the books of Arsenal without making a league appearance.

References

1930 births
2006 deaths
Sportspeople from Welwyn Garden City
Footballers from Hertfordshire
English footballers
Association football forwards
Arsenal F.C. players
Lincoln City F.C. players
York City F.C. players
Yeovil Town F.C. players
English Football League players